Thomas More School is an American private school in San Jose, California operated by the Society of Saint Pius X providing a traditional Roman Catholic education. From its website Mission's Statement, "The mission of Thomas More School is auxiliary to the mission of the Catholic Church, which is to lead man to union with God as his last end.  Thomas More School was founded in 1977 in order to inspire and guide children in the true purpose of education. Man was created to know, love and serve God in this world and to be happy with Him forever in the next. Consequently, it is the goal of  Thomas More School to provide the children of Catholic families with a thorough education founded upon traditional principles of education. This way, they will be formed into true Catholics, learning to love and serve God in every aspect of their daily lives and be lead to union with God in their ultimate end.

History
Established in 1978, the school was previously known as Saint Thomas Aquinas School, and had also been referred to by the name St. Thomas More School.

Until the campus move to the current location in 2004, the school was located in buildings on the grounds of the San Jose Flea Market.  At the same time as this move the school shortened its name to the current form.

References

External links
Official Website
Great Schools profile

Private K-12 schools in California
Catholic secondary schools in California
High schools in San Jose, California
Educational institutions established in 1978
Catholic elementary schools in California
Private elementary schools in California
1978 establishments in California